Majumdar is a family surname.

Etymology and history
The name literally translates to 'record keeper' or 'archivist', from the Arabic language  (/) 'collection' + the Persian suffix  (/) 'possessor'. The surname has evolved from this title.

The surname is found among both Hindu and Muslim Bengalis and should not be confused with the similar "Mujumdar" or "Muzumdar", found among Marathis, and to some extent among the peoples of Gujarat, Madhya Pradesh, and Uttar Pradesh. The Bengali Mirashdars living in the former Kachari Kingdom were given titles by the Kachari Raja, which in modern-day acts as a surname for them.

Variations
Variations of the surname Majumdar also remain very common. These include different English transliterations and regional pronunciations of the term. Different English spellings include: Mojumdar, Majumder, Mojumder, Mazumdar, Mozumdar, Mazumder, Mozumder, Majoomdar, Mojoomdar, Majoomder, Mojoomder, Mazoomdar, Mozoomdar, Mazoomder, Mozoomder and Muzumdar.

List of people with the surname

Majumdar
Aarti Majumdar American actress of Indian descent, better known as Aarti Mann
Anita Majumdar, Canadian actress
Amiya Bhūşhan Majumdār, novelist
Apala Majumdar, British mathematician
Apratim Majumdar, classical musician
Arun Majumdar, first Director of the Advanced Research Projects Agency - Energy, U.S. Department of Energy
Badiul Alam Majumdar, Bangladeshi economist, development worker, political analyst
Bibhal Majumdar, cricketer
Binoy Majumdar, Bengali poet
Boria Majumdar, journalist, author, and cricket historian
Chanchal Kumar Majumdar, physicist, founder of S. N. Bose National Centre for Basic Sciences
Charu Majumdar, Maoist revolutionary and founder of the Communist Party of India (Marxist–Leninist)
Chittabrata Majumdar (1935–2007), General Secretary of Centre of Indian Trade Unions
Dakshinaranjan Mitra Majumdar, fairy tale writer
Hemen Majumdar, Indian painter
Janab Ali Majumdar, Bengali politician
Kamal Kumar Majumdar (1914–1979), writer
Karun Krishna Majumdar, only IAF pilot to be decorated with a Bar on his DFC
Leela Majumdar, author
Mahmudur Rahman Majumdar, commanding officer of East Pakistan Regiment Centre
Manu Majumdar, Bangladeshi Member of Parliament for Netrokona-1
Mohitlal Majumdar (1888–1952), author
Phani Majumdar, Indian director
Pinaki Majumdar, condensed matter physicist
R. C. Majumdar, compiler and partial author of The History and Culture of the Indian Peoples, a definitive work on Indian history, and other works
Ramendu Majumdar, Bangladeshi actor
Ramesh Chandra Majumdar, physicist who made contributions in statistical mechanics and ionospheric physics
Rakhee Majumdar, Indian actress
Ronu Majumdar, flautist
Samaresh Majumdar, author. Magsaysay awardee. Sahitya Akademi, 1984
Saikat Majumdar, novelist.
Simon Majumdar, British-American chef, author, and television personality
Air Commodore S. K. Majumdar, India's first military helicopter pilot 
Sreela Majumdar, actress
Sudhansu Datta Majumdar, physicist
Sudhir Ranjan Majumdar, former Chief Minister of Tripura
Tarun Majumdar, director. National Film Award, 1979
Tejendra Majumdar, sarod player

Mazumdar
Abdul Matlib Mazumdar (1890–1980), Indian freedom fighter and political leader
Abraham Mazumdar, Indian conductor and violinist
Ambica Charan Mazumdar (1850–1922), Indian politician, President of the Indian National Congress
Anita Mazumdar Desai, novelist. Sahitya Akademi, 1978. Shortlisted three times for the Booker Prize
Asit Mazumdar, Indian politician
Anupam Mazumdar, British-Indian Theoretical Physicist
Birendra Nath Mazumdar, (died 1987), doctor and only Indian prisoner in Colditz
Chandana Mazumdar, Bangladeshi singer
Chittrovanu Mazumdar (born 1956), Kolkata-based artist
Lakshmi Mazumdar, National Commissioner of the Indian Scouting organization from 1964 to 1983
Leela Majumdar (1908–2007), Bengali writer
Maxim Mazumdar (1952–1988), Indo-Canadian playwright and director
Nalin Mazumdar, ustaad of the Hawaiian Guitar, also known as the Slide Guitar
Nirode Mazumdar, Indian painter from the first generation of Indian modernists
Pandit Ronu Mazumdar (born 1963), Indian flautist in the Hindustani Classical Music tradition
Pratap Chandra Mazumdar (1840–1905), leader of the Hindu reform movement, the Brahmo Samaj, in Bengal
Sandhya Mazumdar, former Test and One Day International cricketer who represented India
Shipra Mazumdar, member of the first women's expedition to successfully climb Mt. Everest
Tarun Mazumdar (born 1931), Indian Bengali film director
Tulip Mazumdar (born 1981) British journalist and broadcaster for the BBC
Vina Mazumdar (1927–2013), Indian academic, feminist, a pioneer in Women studies in India

Majumder
Kamal Ahmed Majumder, Bangladeshi politician
Khaleda Zia née Majumder, Prime Minister of Bangladesh (1991–1996 and 2001–2006), Chair of the Bangladesh Nationalist Party
Maia Majumder, American computational epidemiologist 
Renuka Majumder, Indian cricketer
Sadhan Chandra Majumder, Bangladeshi politician
Shaun Majumder, Canadian comedian and actor
Silajit Majumder,  songwriter and actor
Debjit Majumder,  footballer

Mazumder
Bappa Mazumder, Bangladeshi lyricist
Barun Mazumder, Indian journalist
Ferdousi Mazumder, Bangladeshi actress
Gauriprasanna Mazumder (1924–1986), Bengali lyricist, best known for Coffee Houser Shei Addata
Hafiz Ahmed Mazumder, Chairman of Bangladesh Red Crescent Society

Other spellings
Akhoy Kumar Mozumdar, first Indian to earn American citizenship
Amol Muzumdar (born 1974), Indian cricketer
Protap Chunder Mozoomdar, Brahmo delegate to the World Parliament of Religions. Distinguished researcher on Christianity

See also
Bura Mazumdar, village in Barguna District in the Barisal Division of southern-central Bangladesh
Majumdar–Ghosh model, one-dimensional quantum Heisenberg spin model
Majumdar-Papapetrou solution
Mazumdar Shaw Medical Centre in Bangalore, India
Mouzadar

Notes

References

External links
 White House press release announcing Arun Majumdar's nomination
 Biography of Karun Krishna Majumdar, DFC
 Times of India coverage of Arpita Majumdar's protest
 Air Commodore S.K. Majumdar

Bengali-language surnames
Indian surnames
Titles in Bangladesh